ZMC is the U.S. Navy designation for an airship (Z) of metal-clad (MC) construction.  The ZMC-2 was the only airship to carry this designation.

References

Airships of the United States Navy